Carson was an Australian blues rock and boogie rock band, which formed in January 1970 in Melbourne as Carson County Band. They had a top 30 hit single on the Go-Set National Top 40 with "Boogie" in September 1972. The group released their debut studio album, Blown, in November on EMI and Harvest Records, which peaked at No. 14 on the Go-Set Top 20 Albums. Their performance at the second Sunbury Pop Festival in late January 1973 was issued as a live album, On the Air, in April but the group had already disbanded.

Member, John Capek had left by mid 1970 and relocated to North America by 1973 where he worked as a composer (often with Marc Jordan), record producer and keyboardist both in Toronto, Canada and in Los Angeles, United States. Broderick Smith, formed country rockers, The Dingoes in 1973 and also had a successful solo career.

History
Carson formed in Melbourne in January 1970 as Carson County Band and, influenced by United States group Canned Heat, performed blues rock and boogie rock. Founders of Carson County Band were Ian Ferguson on bass guitar and vocals, Greg "Sleepy" Lawrie on slide guitar and dobro (Creatures, Chocolate),  Tony Lunt on drums, Tony "Drunkbelly" Enery on Keyboard. Their debut single, "On the Highway", was issued in May on Rebel Records. In October they dropped the County Band from the name to avoid being confused as a country music group. Capek left mid 1970 to join King Harvest and eventually moved to North America. He worked as a composer (often with Marc Jordan), record producer and keyboardist both in Toronto, Canada and in Los Angeles.

Broderick Smith (Adderley Smith Blues Band) replaced Ian Ferguson in mid 1971, providing vocals and harmonica. Ian Winter had joined on guitar at the beginning of 1971. The group released a second single, "Travelling South" in August on Havoc Records. Ian Ferguson, who later on joined Island and played at Sunbury in 1972, went on to form Tank late in 1972, had already left in July to be replaced successively by Barry Sullivan and then Garry Clarke. Mal Logan on keyboards joined later that year. Carson performed at the first Sunbury Pop Festival in late January 1972. On the Easter weekend, 31 March – 2 April, they played two sets at the Mulwala Pop Festival, supporting head-liners Canned Heat and Stephen Stills.

Smith spent part of 1972 recording solo material. Meanwhile, Carson, with Smith returned, issued their next single "Boogie" in September, which reached No. 30 on the Go-Set National Top 40. This was followed in November by their debut album, Blown on Harvest Records produced by Rod Coe, which reached No. 14 on Go-Set Top 20 Albums.

Carson performed at the second Sunbury Pop Festival, on the Australia Day long weekend in late January 1973. Ian Winter left soon after and by February, Carson had disbanded. A live recording of their Sunbury set, On the Air was released in April 1973. Smith was a founding member of country rockers, The Dingoes and later had a successful solo career.

Personnel
Listed alphabetically:
John Capek – piano, vocals, keyboards (1970)
Mal Capewell – saxophone (1972–1973)
Gary Clarke – bass guitar (1971–1973)
Ian Ferguson – bass guitar, vocals (1970–1971)
Greg Lawrie – slide guitar, dobro (1970–1973)
Mal Logan – keyboards (1971–1973)
Tony Lunt – drums (1970–1973)
Broderick Smith – vocals, harmonica (1971–1973)
Barry Sullivan – bass guitar (1971)
Ian Winter – guitar (1971–1973)

Discography

Albums

Singles

References

General
  Note: Archived [on-line] copy has limited functionality.
  Note: [on-line] version of The Who's Who of Australian Rock was established at White Room Electronic Publishing Pty Ltd in 2007 and was expanded from the 2002 edition. As from, September 2010 the [on-line] version shows an 'Internal Service Error' and was no longer available.
Specific

Australian blues musical groups
Musical groups established in 1970
Musical groups disestablished in 1973
Victoria (Australia) musical groups